Gymnobathra inaequata is a moth of the family Oecophoridae. It was described by Philpott in 1928. It is found in New Zealand.

References

 Gymnobathra inaequata in species-id

Moths described in 1928
Oecophoridae